Oh Yeah! Cartoons is an American animated anthology series that aired on Nickelodeon. Created by Fred Seibert, it was produced by Frederator Incorporated and Nickelodeon Animation Studio, running as part of Nickelodeon's Nicktoons lineup. In the show's first season, it was hosted by a variety of schoolchildren, and the second season was hosted by Kenan Thompson of All That and Kenan & Kel, and later Josh Server of All That in the third and final season. Bill Burnett composed the show's theme music.

In terms of total volume, Oh Yeah! Cartoons remains TV's biggest animation development program ever. Giving several dozen filmmakers the opportunity to create 96 seven-minute cartoons, the series eventually yielded three dedicated half-hour spin-off shows produced by Frederator: The Fairly OddParents, ChalkZone, and My Life as a Teenage Robot.

Nickelodeon's Oh Yeah! featured in its first season a total of 39 brand new seven-minute cartoons, surpassing the number of new cartoons and characters on any other single network. In its full run, Oh Yeah! Cartoons featured and produced 96 cartoons.

Many of the animated shorts were created by cartoonists who later became more prominent, including Bob Boyle, Bill Burnett, Jaime Diaz, Greg Emison, John Eng, Thomas R. Fitzgerald, John Fountain, Antoine Guilbaud, Butch Hartman, Larry Huber, Ken Kessel, Alex Kirwan, Steve Marmel, Seth MacFarlane, Zac Moncrief, Carlos Ramos, Rob Renzetti, C. Miles Thompson, Byron Vaughns, Pat Ventura, Vincent Waller, and Dave Wasson. 

Many of its animators featured had worked two years earlier on Cartoon Network's What a Cartoon!, produced in the same concept by Hanna-Barbera and Cartoon Network Studios, which was also created by Seibert while he was president of that historical studio.

Legacy
Oh Yeah! Cartoons is the second Frederator short cartoon incubator. Frederator Studios has persisted in the tradition of surfacing new talent, characters, and series with several cartoon shorts "incubators," including (as of 2016): What A Cartoon! (Cartoon Network, 1995), The Meth Minute 39 (Channel Frederator, 2008), Random! Cartoons (Nickelodeon/Nicktoons, 2008), Too Cool! Cartoons (Cartoon Hangover, 2012), and GO! Cartoons (Cartoon Hangover, 2017). These laboratories have spun off notable series like: Dexter's Laboratory, The Powerpuff Girls, ChalkZone, Johnny Bravo, Cow & Chicken, My Life as a Teenage Robot, Courage the Cowardly Dog, The Fairly OddParents, Nite Fite, Fanboy & Chum Chum, Adventure Time, Bravest Warriors, Rocket Dog, and Bee and PuppyCat.

Filmography 
Fred Seibert cartoon shorts filmography

Episodes

Similar shows
 Random! Cartoons (Nicktoons)
 Disney's Raw Toonage (CBS)
 What a Cartoon! (Cartoon Network)
 Shorty McShorts' Shorts (Disney Channel)
 KaBlam! (Nickelodeon)
 Short Circutz (YTV)
 The Cartoonstitute (Cartoon Network)
 DC Nation Shorts (Cartoon Network)
 Liquid Television (MTV)

See also

Spike and Mike's Festival of Animation
Liquid Television
Disney's Raw Toonage
What a Cartoon!
KaBlam!
Cartoon Sushi
Funpak
Exposure
Eye Drops
VH1 ILL-ustrated
Nicktoons Film Festival
Shorty McShorts' Shorts
Wedgies
Random Cartoons
The Cartoonstitute
Off the Air
Nickelodeon Animated Shorts Program
Too Cool! Cartoons
Cartoon Network Shorts Department
TripTank
Disney XD Shortstop
Go! Cartoons
Love, Death & Robots

References

External links

 
 

Nicktoons
1990s American animated television series
2000s American animated television series
1990s American anthology television series
2000s American anthology television series
1998 American television series debuts
2001 American television series endings
1990s Nickelodeon original programming
2000s Nickelodeon original programming
American children's animated anthology television series
American children's animated comedy television series
American television series with live action and animation
Annie Award winners
English-language television shows
Frederator Studios
All That
American television series revived after cancellation